KPSC may refer to:

 The ICAO code for Tri-Cities Airport (Washington)
 KPSC (FM), a radio station (88.5 FM) licensed to Palm Springs, California, United States
 Kerala Public Service Commission
 Karnataka Public Service Commission, a staff selection commission for Government of Karnataka, India
 Knot density: knots per square centimeter